Ruesga is a municipality in Cantabria Province, Spain. It includes the following 6 villages: Calseca, Matienzo, Mentera Barruelo, Ogarrio, Riva (capital) and Valle. 
As of 2016, a total of 870 people lived in Ruesga.
Its economy is primarily agriculture and forestry; livestock mountain or forestal exploitation of wealth employs 53.1% of the workforce. There were almost 5,000 heads of livestock spread over 198 farms. 
The unemployment rate was 14.7%.

References

Municipalities in Cantabria